The 1929 season was the Hawthorn Football Club's 5th season in the Victorian Football League and 28th overall.

Fixture

Premiership Season

Ladder

References

Hawthorn Football Club seasons